Republic is a city in Christian and Greene counties in the U.S. state of Missouri. As of the 2020 census, the city's population was 18,750. In 2019, its population was 16,938, making it the second largest city in Greene County in the U.S. state of Missouri. It is part of the Springfield, Missouri, Metropolitan Statistical Area.

History
Early settlement in southwest Greene County centered on the community of Little York.  When the Atlantic & Pacific Railroad built a line through the area in the early 1870s, Little York was not on the route.  Settlement moved two miles away to Brookline which was on the rail line's route.

Another group of settlers decided to take up residency at another area along the tracks just four miles southwest of Brookline.  This village eventually became known as Republic, and was incorporated in 1871  While the railroad did go through Republic, there initially was no switch or depot located in the city.  A public subscription of $1000 raised the funds to build a depot in the city.  Subsequent growth is attributed to the depot's completion.

Consolidation with Village of Brookline
In 2005, the cities of Republic and Brookline consolidated as Missouri State laws allow after a vote of the residents of both communities approved the consolidation with Republic taking over all aspects of city government. Originally, Brookline was to retain its own identity, but the city limit signs have since been changed to Republic's. However, according to Section I (b) of the Intergovernmental Agreement:
"Name of Consolidated Municipality - The name of the consolidated municipality shall be "City of Republic."  To help preserve the identity of the Village, the City will place signs with text “Village of Brookline” at the current corporate limits of the Village.  Placement of signage is subject to State sign regulations when placed in State right-of-way. The City of Republic will work with the United States Postal Service to help preserve the history and operation of the Brookline Station Post Office.

While the Village of Brookline no longer exists as an independent, incorporated community, the post office and associated ZIP Code of 65619 remain in operation.  In addition, BNSF Railway continues to designate Brookline as a station point on its network map and system timetables.

Geography
Republic is located at  (37.121652, -93.471440). Most of the city lies in Greene County, and the other is in Christian County.

Demographics

July 1st 2018 Census Estimate (Latest)
As of the July 1st 2018 Census Estimate, there were 16,510 people living in the city.

The racial makeup of the city was 94.6% White, 0.1% African American, 0.3% Native American, 1.7% Asian, and 2.9% from two or more races. Hispanic or Latino of any race were 3.0% of the population.

2010 census
As of the census of 2010, there were 14,751 people, 5,516 households, and 3,999 families living in the city. The racial makeup of the city was 95.6% White, 0.7% African American, 0.6% Native American, 0.5% Asian, 0.6% from other races, and 2.0% from two or more races. Hispanic or Latino of any race were 2.2% of the population.

There were 5,516 households, of which 42.3% had children under the age of 18 living with them, 54.2% were married couples living together, 13.0% had a female householder with no husband present, 5.2% had a male householder with no wife present, and 27.5% were non-families. 22.2% of all households were made up of individuals, and 8.1% had someone living alone who was 65 years of age or older. The average household size was 2.64 and the average family size was 3.09.

The median age in the city was 32.2 years. 29.6% of residents were under the age of 18; 8.2% were between the ages of 18 and 24; 30.9% were from 25 to 44; 20.5% were from 45 to 64; and 10.7% were 65 years of age or older. The gender makeup of the city was 47.7% male and 52.3% female.

2000 census
As of the census of 2000, there were 8,438 people, 3,148 households, and 2,379 families living in the city. The population density was 1,508.1 people per square mile (581.8/km2). There were 3,298 housing units at an average density of 589.4 per square mile (227.4/km2). The racial makeup of the city was 97.43% White, 0.24% African American, 0.56% Native American, 0.49% Asian, 0.02% Pacific Islander, 0.24% from other races, and 1.03% from two or more races. Hispanic or Latino of any race were 1.04% of the population.

There were 3,148 households, out of which 41.1% had children under the age of 18 living with them, 59.7% were married couples living together, 12.4% had a female householder with no husband present, and 24.4% were non-families. 20.8% of all households were made up of individuals, and 8.9% had someone living alone who was 65 years of age or older. The average household size was 2.63 and the average family size was 3.04.

In the city, the population was spread out, with 28.7% under the age of 18, 8.1% from 18 to 24, 32.0% from 25 to 44, 18.9% from 45 to 64, and 12.3% who were 65 years of age or older. The median age was 33 years. For every 100 females, there were 88.2 males. For every 100 females age 18 and over, there were 82.1 males.

The median income for a household in the city was $34,611, and the median income for a family was $37,622. Males had a median income of $30,849 versus $21,725 for females. The per capita income for the city was $15,212. About 5.8% of families and 6.7% of the population were below the poverty line, including 7.8% of those under age 18 and 10.2% of those age 65 or over.

Transportation
Republic is located on U.S. Highway 60.  Through the city limits, U.S. 60 runs concurrent with Missouri Route 413.  Interstate 44 skirts the northern city limits.  Missouri Route 360 (future Interstate 244), also known as James River Freeway, begins at an interchange with I-44 north of the city limit and heads east to the U.S. 60 interchange.  From here, eastward, the freeway takes on the U.S. 60 designation.

The city is served by BNSF Railway, formerly the Burlington Northern Railroad.  The railroad's Cherokee Subdivision runs through the community on its route between Tulsa, Oklahoma and Memphis, Tennessee.  When combined with other subdivisions, this route makes up an important corridor linking California with Birmingham and Atlanta. Primary commodities carried on trains include freight and intermodal shipments.  Passenger trains stopped running through the community in 1967.

Education

Primary and secondary education
Republic is part of Republic School District.  The district has the following schools:
 Republic High School
 Republic Middle School
 Lyon Elementary
 McCulloch Elementary
 Price Elementary
 Schofield Elementary
 Sweeny Elementary
 Republic Early Childhood Center

There are school sports and other activities available for middle and high school students, including football, volleyball, band, choir, academic and specialty clubs, and robotics.

Controversies
On July 25, 2011, the school board elected to ban two books from the school library. Twenty Boy Summer by Sarah Ockler and Slaughterhouse-Five by Kurt Vonnegut were slated for removal in deference to a complaint by a local resident, a professor at Missouri State University whose own children are homeschooled. The resident claimed the contents of the book are profane and violate the teachings of the Bible. The books were removed on grounds of violating the board's guidelines on book content.

Higher education 
Ozarks Technical Community College opened its Republic Center in August 2020. The center serves as a satellite campus offering multiple degree programs to Republic and the surrounding communities.

Notable people
 Charles Harrison Brown, two-term U.S. representative from Missouri's 7th congressional district from 1957–1961.
 Ross Carter, American football player
 Stephen R. Bough, Federal Judge Western District of Missouri

See also

 National Register of Historic Places listings in Greene County, Missouri
 Wilson's Creek National Battlefield
 Young Brothers Massacre
 Brookline, Missouri

References

External links
 City of Republic
 Republic Mo News, local newspaper
 Republic School District
 Historic maps of Republic in the Sanborn Maps of Missouri Collection at the University of Missouri

Populated places established in 2005
Cities in Christian County, Missouri
Cities in Greene County, Missouri
Springfield metropolitan area, Missouri
Cities in Missouri